Even–Rodeh code is a universal code encoding the non-negative integers developed by Shimon Even and Michael Rodeh.

Encoding 

To code a non-negative integer  in Even–Rodeh coding:
 If  is not less than 4 then set the coded value to a single 0 bit.  Otherwise the coded value is empty.
 Go back to step 2.

To decode an Even–Rodeh-coded integer:
 Read 3 bits and store the value into .
 If the first bit read was 0 then stop.
 If the first bit read was 1 then continue to step 2.
 Examine the next bit.
 If the bit is 0 then read 1 bit and stop.

Examples

See also 
 Elias omega (ω) coding

References 

Lossless compression algorithms